Bakonybél is a village in Veszprém county, Hungary, in Zirc District. A  tourist destination with a number of  sights and activities, the village is located in a basin surrounded by nearby mountains.

History 
The history of the village is closely connected to the Benedictine Bakonybél Abbey founded by Saint Stephen I in 1018. Saint Gellert resided here as a hermit between 1023 and 1030. The village had been completely destroyed during the Ottoman occupation and was later rebuilt and repopulated with Slovaks and Germans.

The Jewish community
In the 19th and 20th centuries, a small Jewish community lived in the village, in 1880 23 Jews lived in the village, most of whom were murdered in the Holocaust. The community had a Jewish cemetery.

Main sights 
The Benedictine church and monastery were built in 1754 in Baroque style. There is also a chapel close to the village with the statue of Saint Gellert, the stations of Christ's sufferings and the holy trinity, at Ivy Spring (also known as Saint Spring), next to a lake supplied by the spring.

Another sight is the Ethnographic Museum in the village. There is also a museum of nature and forestry called the House of the Bakony Forests.

Another attraction is a 19th-century American ranch, not very far from the village, with horse-related activities.

There are also multiple routes for trips in the nearby forests and hills, offering scenery, caves and a lookout tower on the highest peak of the Bakony Mountains.

Facilities 
There is a three star hotel and several guest houses in the village. There are also restaurants and pubs. A number of small grocery stores and also separate greengrocers are available.There is a community house providing tourist information, a doctor's office, and catering. The village has its own post office, pharmacy, day nursery, primary school and library with Internet access.

See also 

 (160001) Bakonybél minor planet,

References

External links 
 Bakonybél's website (Hungarian)

Populated places in Zirc District
Jewish communities destroyed in the Holocaust